Francesc (Cesc, Francisco) Godoy Contreras (born 17 December 1986 in Barcelona), is a Spanish professional triathlete, U23 National Champion of the years 2006 and 2007, and member of the Spanish National Team 2010.

Among the non ITU competitions, Godoy was especially successful at the Embrunman in 2008, winning the silver medal (short distance), and at the Triathlon EDF Alpe d'Huez of the year 2010, winning silver again.
In Spain, Godoy represents the Club de Natació Barcelona (CN Barcelona).

Francesc Godoy's younger sister Anna is also a professional triathlete.

ITU Competitions 
In the seven years from 2004 to 2010, Godoy took part in 43 ITU competitions and achieved 12 top ten positions.

The following list is based upon the official ITU rankings and the Athlete's Profile Page. Obviously, however, this ITU list confuses father and son Francesc (Cesc, Francisco) Godoy. The two European Championships of the years 1990 and 1991 must be ascribed to Godoy senior and are not reported below.
Unless indicated otherwise, the following events are Olympic Distance Triathlons and belong to the Elite category.

BG = the sponsor British Gas · DNF = did not finish · DNS = did not start

Notes 

Spanish male triathletes
1986 births
Living people